In enzymology, an indolepyruvate C-methyltransferase is an enzyme that catalyzes the chemical reaction

S-adenosyl-L-methionine + (indol-3-yl)pyruvate  S-adenosyl-L-homocysteine + (3S)-3-(indol-3-yl)-3-oxobutanoate

Thus, the two substrates of this enzyme are S-adenosyl methionine and (indol-3-yl)pyruvate, whereas its two products are S-adenosylhomocysteine and (3S)-3-(indol-3-yl)-3-oxobutanoate.

Nomenclature 

This enzyme belongs to the family of transferases, specifically those transferring one-carbon group methyltransferases.  The systematic name of this enzyme class is S-adenosyl-L-methionine: (indol-3-yl)pyruvate C-methyltransferase. Other names in common use include indolepyruvate methyltransferase, indolepyruvate 3-methyltransferase, indolepyruvic acid methyltransferase, and S-adenosyl-L-methionine:indolepyruvate C-methyltransferase.  This enzyme participates in tryptophan metabolism.

References 

 

EC 2.1.1
Enzymes of unknown structure